Nikos Vrettos (born 24 October 1995) is a Greek professional footballer who plays as a forward for Super League 2 club Irodotos.

References

1995 births
Living people
Super League Greece 2 players
Football League (Greece) players
OFI Crete F.C. players
Association football forwards
Footballers from Heraklion
Greek footballers